Roya Afshar (born 1960 in Abadan) is an Iranian Actor who won the Crystal Simorgh for best actress at the 39th Fajr Film Festival in Iran and also won the best actress award at the  in France, for her role in Mom (Maman 2021) directed by Arash Anisi.

RefeReferences

External links
 
 

Living people
Iranian film actresses
Iranian actresses
Crystal Simorgh for Best Actress winners
1960 births